Tattoos and Shadows is a colour photograph created by Canadian photographer Jeff Wall in 2000. It was staged and inspired by a classical work of art, like others of his photographs. It is exhibited in a lightbox at the San Francisco Museum of Modern Art.

History and description
The staged photograph was inspired by the painting Luncheon on the Grass (1863), by Édouard Manet. The original painting had been inspired itself by the Pastoral Concert (c. 1510), now attributed to Titian. The original painting had a nude woman looking at the viewer, at the center of the composition, while she was addressed by a man, and had another man at her left side.
In Wall photograph, the set is changed to a suburban garden, where a large tree stands, with her foliage filtering the light. Three figures appear, of which two are female and one male, but they don't interact with each other, and the women have absent gazes. A man seated at the right in the grass is casually dressed in a shirt and shorts, displaying his arm tattoos, while he reads attently a book. His sunglasses and a plastic bottle lie in the nearby ground. At the center of the composition, an Asian girl leans calmly, seemingly relaxed, dressed in a pink shirt and jeans, with one of her hands on her head, touching the tree, while the other hand is between her legs. To her left, a redhead woman is seated in the ground, with her legs crossed, wearing a greenish dress, while also showing her right arm tattoo. Her eyes are lowered and she doesn't look at the viewer. At her front, a small bottle lies in the ground. An empty chair stands at her left and her slippers lie in the ground, left of the chair.

References

2000s photographs
Color photographs
Photographs by Jeff Wall
Photographs of the San Francisco Museum of Modern Art